Huonia melvillensis is a species of dragonfly of the family Libellulidae, 
known as the forestwatcher. 
It is the only species of Huonia in Australia, where it has been found on Melville Island, Northern Territory. It inhabits pools in streams.
It is a small dragonfly with black and pale green markings and a clubbed abdomen.

Gallery

See also
 List of Odonata species of Australia

References

Libellulidae
Odonata of Australia
Taxa named by Graham R. Brown
Taxa named by Günther Theischinger
Insects described in 1998